The Dunsmuir station is located in Dunsmuir, British Columbia. The station was a flag stop on Via Rail's Dayliner service. The station is on the Southern Railway of Vancouver Island mainline, first appearing in railway maps in 1918. The station is named after Robert Dunsmuir, one of the early founders of the railway. Service ended in 2011.

Footnotes

External links 
Via Rail Station Description

Via Rail stations in British Columbia
Railway stations in Canada opened in 1918
Railway stations closed in 2011
Disused railway stations in Canada